Preble may refer to:

People 
 Edward Preble (1761–1807), U.S. naval officer
 Edward Alexander Preble (1871–1957), American naturalist and conservationist
 George H. Preble (1816–1885), U.S. naval officer, nephew of Edward Preble
 T. M. Preble (1810–1907), American Free Will Baptist minister and Millerite preacher

Places
 Preble, Indiana, a town
 Preble, New York, a town
 Preble, Wisconsin, a former town now part of Green Bay
 Preble County, Ohio
 Preble Township, Adams County, Indiana
 Preble Township, Fillmore County, Minnesota

Military
 USS Preble, various ships
 Fort Preble, South Portland, Maine
 Preble Hall at the United States Naval Academy

Other uses
 Preble High School, Green Bay, Wisconsin

See also
Prebble, a surname